The 1991 Sandžak autonomy referendum was held in Sandžak, Serbia, between 25 and 27 October 1991. Voters were asked whether they supported autonomy. 

The Serbian government declared the referendum unconstitutional.

Results

References

Referendums in Serbia
Referendums in Montenegro
1991 in Yugoslavia
1991 referendums
History of Sandžak